is a private university in Hachioji, Tokyo, Japan. The precursor of the school was founded in 1880 by Masataka Fujita, and it was chartered as a university in 1949. The school of Life sciences was established in 1994.

Notable alumni
 Jun Matsumoto, a member of the House of Representatives in the Diet of Japan
 Chang Kuo Chou, a Taiwanese pharmacist

References

External links
 Official website

Private universities and colleges in Japan
Educational institutions established in 1880
Pharmacy schools in Japan
Universities and colleges in Tokyo
1880 establishments in Japan
Hachiōji, Tokyo